Saint-Julien-Innocence-Eulalie is a commune in the Dordogne department in Nouvelle-Aquitaine in southwestern France. It was established on 1 January 2019 by merger of the former communes of Sainte-Innocence (the seat), Sainte-Eulalie-d'Eymet and Saint-Julien-d'Eymet.

See also
Communes of the Dordogne department

References

Communes of Dordogne
Dordogne communes articles needing translation from French Wikipedia